Vietnam: The Ten Thousand Day War, a 26-part half-hour Canadian television documentary about the Vietnam War, was produced in 1980 by Michael Maclear. The series aired in Canada on CBC Television, in the United States on NBC, and the United Kingdom on Channel 4.

Maclear visited Vietnam during the production of the series and while he was there, he was granted access to film material. He was the first Western journalist to be allowed to visit Vietnam since the end of the war.

The documentary series was consolidated into 13 hour-long episodes for American television syndication. The series was released on videocassette format by Embassy and won a National Education Association award for best world documentary.

Series writer Peter Arnett was an Associated Press reporter in Vietnam from 1962 to 1975.

CBC only aired 18 of the 26 episodes during the 1980–81 season because the production of the series was incomplete. The remaining 8 episodes were broadcast during CBC's 1981–82 season. British audiences saw the series during Channel 4's 1984–85 season.

Episodes

References

External links
 Queen's University Directory of CBC Television Series (The Ten Thousand Day War archived listing link via archive.org)
 BFI: Vietnam: The Ten Thousand Day War episode list
 TVArchive.ca: The Ten Thousand Day War (archived at the Wayback Machine)
 
 Michael Maclear website

CBC Television original programming
Channel 4 original programming
1980s Canadian documentary television series
Documentary films about the Vietnam War
Documentary television series about the Cold War